Paula Ruiz Bravo (born 16 February 1999) is a Spanish swimmer, specialising in open water events. She competed in the women's 10 km event at the 2019 World Aquatics Championships, finishing in 24th place.

Notes

References

External links
 

1999 births
Living people
Spanish female long-distance swimmers
Place of birth missing (living people)
Swimmers at the 2015 European Games
European Games competitors for Spain